Brian Leddin is an Irish Green Party politician who has been a Teachta Dála (TD) for the Limerick City constituency since the 2020 general election. He was appointed Chair of the Joint Oireachtas Committee on Climate Action in September 2020, is a member of the Joint Oireachtas Committee on Agriculture, Food and the Marine, and Chair of the Green Party's parliamentary party. He is the Green Party spokesperson for Transport, Energy and Climate Action.

Political career 
Brian Leddin joined the Green Party in 2017. When he successfully ran in the 2019 local elections, he became the Green Party's first-ever Limerick City and County Councillor, representing Limerick North Central ward, and his election as a TD to the 33rd Dáil in February 2020 made him Limerick's first-ever Green Party TD. After his election to the Dáil, Saša Novak Uí Chonchúir was co-opted to Leddin's seat on Limerick City and County Council.

Dáil and Committee Contributions

Climate Action 
On 23 July 2021, President Michael D. Higgins signed the Climate Action and Low Carbon Development (Amendment) Act 2021 into law, setting Ireland on a legally-binding path to net-zero emissions no later than 2050, and to a 51 per cent reduction in emissions by the end of this decade. Of the Climate Bill and subsequent climate action, Leddin said “With societal transformation will come unparalleled economic and employment opportunities – in renewable energy, nature conservation, sustainable transport and in retrofitting our homes and schools and hospitals. Climate action will help rebalance our society as a fairer and healthier one, which treads far more lightly on our land.” 

The Climate Bill had undergone extensive pre-legislative scrutiny to strengthen the bill by the Joint Oireachtas Committee on Climate Action, of which Brian Leddin is Chair, publishing its report on the draft of the bill on 18 December 2020. The report made 78 recommendations to the draft bill, with Leddin acknowledging the cross party, collaborative nature of the work.

On 21 April 2021, Leddin spoke in the Dáil debate on the Climate Action and Low Carbon Development (Amendment) Bill 2021: Second Stage. He spoke on the collaborative cross-party work of the Joint Oireachtas Committee on Climate Action, the employment opportunities presented in the renewable energy sector along the West coast, and the impact of climate action on societal transformation for better quality of life, for a fairer and healthier society, while acknowledging the scale of the challenge ahead.

Controversies 
In June 2021, Leddin was accused of conflict of interest after it was revealed that Arup, his former employer of five years, were consulting engineers on the Shannon LNG project. Leddin denied knowing that his former employers were acting as consulting engineers for the project, as he had left the company at that stage. He outlined that any ruling on amendments out of order is on the advice of the Oireachtas officials and that this advice is strictly in compliance with standing orders. The Bills Office in the Houses of the Oireachtas scrutinises the text of any amendments to a bill submitted by members as it goes through Committee Stage and Report Stage to ensure it complies with Standing Orders, Rulings of the Chair and other matters of order.

Leddin came under fire for posting an image on Twitter in July 2021 of a scene from Father Ted where the character Tom is shooting crows, in response to a discussion about managing seagulls. Pauline McLynn criticised him for the post, saying they were "disgraceful" and that the Green Party should be "appalled" by his behaviour". Leddin responded that the image was posted in jest and reiterated his commitment to animal welfare and protection.’

In August 2021, Leddin met with his party's executive after comments he made in a WhatsApp group chat emerged, in which he referred to Limerick City and County Council councillor Elisa O'Donovan as "unhinged" and "craving fame", for which his fellow Green Party TD Neasa Hourigan called for him to be sanctioned. The democratically-elected Executive Council of the Green Party made the decision not to sanction him.

Personal life 
Leddin's mother Kathleen is a former Mayor of Limerick and an Independent member of Limerick City Council, and his father Tim was also Mayor of Limerick and also a Fine Gael member of Limerick City Council. His granduncle Michael Keyes was a Labour Party politician who served as a TD in 1927, and then from 1933 to 1957.

Outside of politics, Leddin is a qualified engineer with a degree in renewable energy systems technology.

References

External links
Green Party profile
Brian Leddin website

Living people
Year of birth missing (living people)
Local councillors in County Limerick
Members of the 33rd Dáil
Green Party (Ireland) TDs